

18th century
1776 – George Clinton, Continental Congressman (July 8), resigned to fight in the American Revolutionary War.
1780 – Elbridge Gerry, Continental Congressman (February 19)
1793 – Thomas Jefferson, United States Secretary of State (December 31), after becoming disillusioned with the Washington administration.
1795 – John Jay, Chief Justice of the United States (June 29), to take office as Governor of New York. 
1800 – Oliver Ellsworth, Chief Justice of the United States (September 30), after personal unpopularity and illness while negotiating the Convention of 1800

19th century
1817 – Daniel D. Tompkins, Governor of New York (February 24), to become Vice President of the United States after the 1816 presidential election. 
1829 – Martin Van Buren, Governor of New York (March 12), to become U.S. Secretary of State under President Andrew Jackson.
1832 – Robert Y. Hayne, United States Senator (December 13), resigned to become Governor of South Carolina.
1832 – John C. Calhoun, Vice President of the United States (December 28), to replace Robert Hayne in the U.S. Senate during the Nullification crisis. 
1848 – Francis R. Shunk, Governor of Pennsylvania (July 9), after contracting tuberculosis.
1849 – Millard Filmore, New York State Comptroller (February 20), to become Vice President of the United States.
1851 – Peter Hardeman Burnett, Governor of California (January 9)
1852 – William R. King, United States Senator of Alabama (December 20), to take office as Vice President of the United States.
1857 – Hannibal Hamlin, Governor of Maine (February 25)
1861 – Hannibal Hamlin, United States Senator of Maine (January 17), to take office as Vice President of the United States.
1867 – Rutherford B. Hayes, United States Representative (July 20), to run for Governor of Ohio
1873 – Henry Wilson, United States Senator of Massachusetts (March 3), to take office as Vice President of the United States.
1877 – Rutherford B. Hayes, Governor of Ohio (March 2), to take office as President of the United States.
1880 – James Garfield, United States Representative (November 8), to take office as President of the United States.
1885 – Grover Cleveland, Governor of New York (January 6), to take office as President of the United States.
1898 – John W. Griggs, Governor of New Jersey (January 31), to accept appointment as U.S. Attorney General under President William McKinley
1898 – Theodore Roosevelt, Assistant Secretary of the Navy (May 10), to lead the Rough Riders in the Spanish American War.

20th century

1901–1960
1905 – Charles W. Fairbanks, United States Senator (March 3), to take office as Vice President of the United States.
1907 – Charles Curtis, United States Representative (January 28), resigned to become Senator to fill the vacancy caused by the resignation of Joseph R. Burton.
1910 – Charles Evans Hughes, Governor of New York (October 6), to accept appointment by President William Howard Taft as Associate Justice of the Supreme Court of the United States. 
1912 – Sun Yat-sen, Provisional President of China, in favor of Yuan Shikai.
1913 – Woodrow Wilson, Governor of New Jersey (March 1), resigned to take office as President of the United States.
1915 – William Jennings Bryan, Secretary of State (June 9), resigned over President Woodrow Wilson's handling of the German submarine sinking of the Lusitania.
1919 – Walter E. Edge, Governor of New Jersey (May 16), resigned to take office in the U.S. Senate.
1920 – Franklin D. Roosevelt, Assistant Secretary of the Navy (August 26), resigned to run for Vice President.
1921 – Warren G. Harding, United States Senator (January 13), resigned to take office as President of the United States.
1929 – Charles Curtis, United States Senator (March 3), resigned to take office as Vice President of the United States.
1930 – William H. Taft, Chief Justice of the United States (February 3), resigned due to poor health.
1940 – Neville Chamberlain, Prime Minister of the United Kingdom (10 May), resigned amidst division in the House of Commons during the Second World War.
1942 – Herbert H. Lehman, Governor of New York (December 3), resigned to begin work at the U.S. Department of State and the United Nations Relief and Rehabilitation Administration.
1945 – Harry S Truman, United States Senator (January 17), resigned to take office as Vice President of the United States
1946 – Henry A. Wallace, United States Secretary of Commerce (September 20), resigned after conflicts with President Harry Truman.
1947 – Edward Martin, Governor of Pennsylvania (January 2), resigned to take office in the U.S. Senate.
1949 – Alben W. Barkley, United States Senator, (January 19), resigned to take office as Vice President of the United States the next day.
1950 – Richard Nixon, United States Representative (November 30), resigned to prepare to take office as United States Senator.
1953 – Richard Nixon, United States Senator (January 1), resigned to take office as Vice President of the United States.
1955 – Winston Churchill, Prime Minister of the United Kingdom (5 April), resigned due to poor health but remained in the House of Commons.
1957 – Anthony Eden, Prime Minister of the United Kingdom, resigned in the aftermath of the 1956 Suez Crisis, making a second-consecutive Conservative resignation of the Prime Minister under Queen Elizabeth II

1961–1970
1960 – John F. Kennedy, United States Senator, (December 22) to become President of the United States after the 1960 United States presidential election
1961 – Lyndon B. Johnson, United States Senate Majority Leader, (January 3) to become Vice President of the United States after the 1960 election.
1963 – Harold Macmillan, Prime Minister of the United Kingdom, (18 October), after the Profumo scandal, making it a third-consecutive Conservative resignation of the Prime Minister under Queen Elizabeth II
1963 – John Profumo, British Secretary of State for War, after misleading the House of Commons in relation to his controversial personal life.
1964 – Hubert Humphrey, United States Senator (December 29), to become Vice President of the United States after the 1964 United States presidential election.
1967 – Gamal Abdel Nasser, President of the United Arab Republic (later retracted)
1968 – Kenneth D. Kaunda, President of the Republic of Zambia, because he refused to lead a nation divided on tribal and regional lines at February 5, 1968 Chilenje Hall meeting. (later retracted after persuasion)
1969 – Charles de Gaulle, President of France, following defeat in a constitutional referendum
1970 – Tunku Abdul Rahman, Prime Minister of Malaysia (September 22)

1971–1980
1973
Spiro Agnew, Vice President of the United States (October 10), over allegations of financial irregularities.
Gerald Ford, United States Representative (December 6), to accept appointment as Vice President of the United States.
Nelson Rockefeller, resigned as long-time Governor of New York so Malcolm Wilson, his lieutenant governor, could run for the office as the incumbent (December 18)
1974
Willy Brandt, Chancellor of West Germany (May 7) after the Guillaume affair. 
Richard Nixon, President of the United States (August 9), after becoming mired in the Watergate scandal and impeachment hearings. 
Jerald terHorst, White House Press Secretary (September 9), resigned in protest of President Gerald Ford's pardon of Richard Nixon.
Kakuei Tanaka, Prime Minister of Japan (December 9) after allegations of corruption and a public inquiry in the National Diet. 
Golda Meir, Prime Minister of Israel (April 11) after becoming unpopular due to the Israeli government's unpreparedness for the Yom Kippur War. 
1976
Cearbhall Ó Dálaigh, President of Ireland, after a falling out with the Irish Government.
Walter Mondale, United States Senator (December 30), resigned to take office as Vice President of the United States.
1977
Yitzhak Rabin, Prime Minister of Israel (April 8), after allegations of financial improprieties.
1978 
Giovanni Leone, President of Italy, after allegations of corruption about the Lockheed scandal (June 15).

1981–1990
1981
Adolfo Suárez, Prime Minister of Spain. (January 29),
Hussein Onn, Prime Minister of Malaysia. (July 16), due to health problems
1984
Pierre Trudeau, Prime Minister of Canada. (June 30), retiring from politics due to unpopularity of the Liberal Party. 
1985
Devan Nair, President of Singapore. (March 28)
1986
Michael Heseltine, British Secretary of State for Defence, resigned from the second Thatcher ministry over differences with Cabinet over the Westland affair. (January 7)
1988
Ferdinand Marcos, President of the Philippines (February 25), actually defeated in elections he tried to rig in his favor triggering protests .
Musa Hitam, Deputy Prime Minister of Malaysia, resigned from the second Mahathir cabinet over differences with prime minister over government policy. (March 16)
1989
Dan Quayle, resigned as U.S. Senator from Indiana to take office as Vice President of the United States (January 3)
David Lange, Prime Minister of New Zealand, over differences with party over "Rogernomics" economic policy. (August 8)
Nigel Lawson, British Chancellor of the Exchequer, over differences with Prime Minister Margaret Thatcher and her refusal to dismiss her Chief Economic Adviser, Sir Alan Walters, who also resigned later the same day. (October 26)
1990
Geoffrey Howe, British Deputy Prime Minister, over differences with Prime Minister Margaret Thatcher over government policy on the European Monetary System. (November 1)
Margaret Thatcher, British Prime Minister, after narrowly failing to win outright in the first round of a leadership contest. (November 27)
Lee Kuan Yew, Prime Minister of Singapore, but later became Senior Minister until 2011, and remained as Member of Parliament until his death on 2015. (November 28)

1991–2000
1991
Albert Reynolds, Irish Minister for Finance.
Bob Hawke, Prime Minister of Australia, after the lost of leadership spill within the Labor Party. Resigned from Parliament, triggering the 1992 Wills by-election. (December 20)
Mikhail Gorbachev, President of the Soviet Union, completing the dissolution of the Soviet Union effectively losing power in Russia to RSFSR President Boris Yeltsin and failing to keep the Soviet republics from declaring independence (December 25)
1992
Bill Clinton, resigned as long-time Governor of Arkansas to take office as President of the United States (December 12)
1993
Al Gore, resigned as U.S. Senator from Tennessee to take office as Vice President of the United States (January 2)
Brian Mulroney, Prime Minister of Canada, retiring from politics due to the Conservative Party's unpopularity in the 1993 federal election after his introduction of the goods and services tax. (June 25)
Ong Teng Cheong, Deputy Prime Minister of Singapore, to take office as President of Singapore after winning the first presidential election (September 1)
Ghafar Baba, Deputy Prime Minister of Malaysia, after losing to Anwar Ibrahim in the UMNO's deputy leadership contest. (October 15)
1994
Morihiro Hosokawa, Prime Minister of Japan. (April 28)
Tsutomu Hata, Prime Minister of Japan. (June 30)
Joycelyn Elders, Surgeon General of the United States, due to controversial opinions on masturbation and drug legalisation. 
1995
Silvio Berlusconi, Prime Minister of Italy (January 17)
1996
Bob Dole, resigned as long-time U.S. Senator from Kansas to campaign for the 1996 U.S. Presidential election, in which he was the Republican Presidential nominee (June 11)
Albert Zafy, President of Madagascar, facing impeachment (September 5)
Zhan Videnov (Prime Minister of Bulgaria) and his government resign in December amidst the financial crisis.
1997
Fife Symington, Governor of Arizona, after convictions for bank fraud (September 5)
Sir Julius Chan, Prime Minister of Papua New Guinea, due to the Sandline affair (March 26)
John Major, former British Prime Minister (resigning as leader of the Conservative Party). (June 19)
Sali Berisha, President of Albania, after the collapse of the government's economic pyramid schemes and the Albanian Civil War. (July 23)
Jim Bolger, Prime Minister of New Zealand, after the lost of leadership spill in the National Party. (December 8)
1998
Levon Ter-Petrossian, President of Armenia (February 3), due to a political crisis over the Nagorno-Karabakh conflict. 
Suharto, 2nd President of Indonesia, ending three decades of the New Order period. (May 21)
Anwar Ibrahim, Deputy Prime Minister of Malaysia (September 2), due to sodomy trials. 
Louis Tobback, Minister of the Interior (September 25), due to a scandal over serial killer Marc Dutroux's escape from prison.
Romano Prodi, Prime Minister of Italy (October 21), after loss of support from the Communist Refoundation Party. 
1999
Newt Gingrich, resigned as the Speaker of the United States House of Representatives after leadership challenge from Dick Gephardt and unpopularity following the impeachment of Bill Clinton. (January 3)
Raúl Cubas Grau, President of Paraguay, facing impeachment (March 28)
Tuariki John Delamere, New Zealand Minister of Immigration (November)
Choo Wee Khiang, Singaporean Member of Parliament, resigned due to conviction over commercial fraud (December)
Boris Yeltsin, President of the Russian Federation, retiring from politics (December 31)
2000
Alberto Fujimori, President of Peru, in a letter sent from Japan; the resignation is not accepted by Congress which instead declares the president "morally unfit" and removes him from office. (November 22)
George W. Bush, resigned as Governor of Texas to take office as President of the United States (December 21)

21st century

2001
Joseph Estrada, President of the Philippines (January 20)
Peter Mandelson, Secretary of State for Northern Ireland, for using his position to influence a passport application for one of the Hinduja brothers, who at the time were under investigation by the Indian government for the Bofors scandal
Christine Todd Whitman, Governor of New Jersey (January 31), to take office as Administrator of the United States Environmental Protection Agency
Mikhail Saakashvili, Georgian Minister for Justice, due to opposition to President Eduard Shevardnadze. 
Tom Ridge, Governor of Pennsylvania (October 5), to become the first Secretary of Homeland Security
Henry McLeish, First Minister of Scotland, over allegations of improper financial dealings.
Hugo Banzer Suárez, President of Bolivia, due to ill health (August 7).
Fernando de la Rúa, President of Argentina, during riots prompted by an economic crisis (December 20); and Adolfo Rodríguez Saá, de la Rúa's interim successor (resignation declared December 30 and accepted January 1, 2002).

2002
Cassam Uteem, President of Mauritius, declaring his refusal to sign controversial anti-terrorism legislation (February 15); Vice President Angidi Chettiar, who became acting president, also resigns for the same reason (February 18).
Hugo Chávez, President of Venezuela, after an opposition march ended with a shootout between government supporters and the Caracas Metropolitan Police, the Llaguno Overpass events, that resulted in 19 dead and 127 injured. The military high command held him responsible for the deaths and demanded his resignation, which he reportedly verbally accepted. However, this is debated.
Pedro Carmona, acting president of Venezuela after the April coup d'état and Chávez' detention. Resigned after the coup failed, after which Chávez was returned to power.

2003
Robin Cook, British Leader of the House of Commons (formerly Foreign Secretary), over his opposition to the UK's involvement in the invasion of Iraq.
Clare Short, British Secretary of State for International Development, because of the Iraq war.
Christine Todd Whitman, Administrator of the United States Environmental Protection Agency, over her disagreements with the Bush administration on pollution controls. 
Charles G. Taylor, President of Liberia, went to exile in Nigeria after being charged for war crimes in the Second Liberian Civil War.
Eduard Shevardnadze, President of Georgia, after extensive public demonstrations against him
Mahathir Mohamad, Prime Minister of Malaysia (October 31).
Freddy Matungulu, Minister of Finance of the Democratic Republic of the Congo, on grounds of ethical divergence from the larger government.
Peter Hollingworth, Governor-General of Australia, in response to an accusation of mishandling a sexual abuse case during his term as Anglican Archbishop of Brisbane (eff. May 28).
Anneli Jäätteenmäki, Prime Minister of Finland (June 18), due to the Iraq leak
Gonzalo Sánchez de Lozada, President of Bolivia, during massive protests against the government's economic policy (October 17).
Jean Chrétien, Prime Minister of Canada, retiring from politics after the sponsorship scandal (December 12)

2004
George Tenet, Director of US Central Intelligence, officially for 'personal reasons', resigned after criticism of the CIA's approach to intelligence used to support the 2003 Iraq War.
François Lonseny Fall, Prime Minister of Guinea, who went into exile after his resignation (April 30).
Goh Chok Tong, Prime Minister of Singapore, but would later remain as Senior Minister until 2011; currently a Member of Parliament. (August 12)
James McGreevey, Governor of New Jersey (November 15), after being mired in Pay to Play and extortion scandals

2005
Michael D. Brown, Director of Federal Emergency Management Agency, after heavy criticism of his handling of emergency management operations in the wake of Hurricane Katrina.
Greg Sorbara, Finance Minister of Ontario, resigned while under investigation by the Ontario Securities Commission. 
Tung Chee Hwa, 1st Chief Executive of Hong Kong, resigned due to health reasons. (March 10)
David Blunkett, British Secretary of State for Work and Pensions, resigning after breaking the Ministerial Code regarding private business appointments, becoming the second minister to resign twice from the Blair government.
Faure Gnassingbé, President of Togo, after succeeding his late father Gnassingbé Eyadéma in a process deemed unconstitutional by the international community (February 25); National Assembly speaker Abass Bonfoh became acting president until Faure was legitimately elected to the presidency on April 24.
Stanislav Gross, Prime Minister of the Czech Republic (April 9), due to corruption allegations over the privatization of Unipetrol. 
Askar Akayev, President of Kyrgyzstan, was forced to resign from office on March 24, is formally accepted by the nation's Parliament (April 11).
Omar Karami, Prime Minister of Lebanon, after failing to form a new government (April 13); he previously resigned February 28.
Ramush Haradinaj, Prime Minister of Kosovo, after his indictment by the International Criminal Tribunal for the former Yugoslavia (March 8); he was later acquitted
Ronald Gajraj, home minister of Guyana, accused of overseeing "phantom death squads" (April 30).
Jean-Pierre Raffarin, Prime Minister of France, after French voters rejected the government-supported referendum on the European Constitution (May 31).
Carlos Mesa, President of Bolivia (resignation offered June 6 and accepted by Congress June 9).
Abdul-Halim Khaddam, Vice President of Syria (June 6).
Zokirjon Almatov, Interior Minister of Uzbekistan, after the government's crackdown in Andijan (December 22).

2006
Prince Lavaka Ata 'Ulukalala, Prime Minister of Tonga, after public demonstrations in favour of reducing royal influence in politics.
Porter Goss, Director of the Central Intelligence Agency. No explanation was given; Goss referred to his decision as "just one of those mysteries".
Bajram Kosumi, Prime Minister of Kosovo, amid widespread unpopularity
Laila Freivalds, Swedish foreign minister, in response to a number of scandals including her ministry's perceived inadequate response to the 2004 Indian Ocean earthquake (March 21).
Snyder Rini, Prime Minister of the Solomon Islands, facing riots after only eight days in office (April 26).
Mari Alkatiri, Prime Minister of East Timor, during the 2006 East Timorese crisis (June 26).
United States Secretary of Defense Donald Rumsfeld, after the opposition Democratic Party took control of Congress in the 2006 midterm elections (November 3).
Opposition members of Lebanon's cabinet, including ministers from the Hezbollah and Amal parties. This led to two years of political crisis and opposition protests surrounding the government buildings. (November 13)
Michael Chong, Minister of Intergovernmental Affairs and President of the Queen's Privy Council for Canada.  Resigned from cabinet in response to the government declaring the Québécois a nation within Canadian Confederation. (November 27)

2007
Iajuddin Ahmed, President of Bangladesh, in his capacity as chief adviser during the 2006–2007 Bangladeshi political crisis (January 11).
Borys Tarasyuk, Foreign Minister of Ukraine (January 30).
Alex Azar, United States Deputy Secretary of Health and Human Services (February 4)
Tony Blair, Prime Minister of the United Kingdom, stepped down as leader of the Labour Party on (June 27), during his third term. 
Su Tseng-Chang, Premier, after failing to secure election as his party's candidate for the 2008 presidential election (12 May).
Hani al-Qawasmi, Interior Minister of Palestine, after the security situation in Gaza worsened (14 May)
Paul Wolfowitz, president of the World Bank, due to the Shaha Riza scandal (17 May).
Alberto Gonzales, United States Attorney General, due to pressure from Congress. 
Shinzo Abe, Prime Minister of Japan, resigned due to health reasons and the Liberal Democratic Party's loss of the House of Councillor election (September 12).
Mike Johanns, United States Secretary of Agriculture, resigned to run for the Senate

2008
Peter Hain, British Work and Pensions and Wales Secretary, after the Electoral Commission referred investigations over political funding to the Police (January 24).
Romano Prodi, Italian Prime Minister, after losing a motion of no confidence in the Senate (January 24).
Eliot Spitzer, Governor of New York, after claims of involvement in a prostitution ring. (March 17)
Thabo Mbeki, resigned as President of South Africa, after illegally interfering in the National Prosecuting Authority. (September 20) 
Yasuo Fukuda, Prime Minister of Japan since 2007, citing problems with health and leadership. (September 24)
Barack Obama, United States Senator (November 16), resigned to become President of the United States

2009
Joe Biden, United States Senator (January 15), resigned to become Vice President of the United States.
Abdullah Ahmad Badawi, Prime Minister of Malaysia (April 3)
Ivo Sanader, Prime Minister of Croatia (July 1)
Sarah Palin, resigned as Governor of Alaska (July 26)
Anders Fogh Rasmussen, resigned as Prime Minister of Denmark, after being confirmed as NATO Secretary General

2010
Gordon Brown, resigned as Prime Minister of the United Kingdom and Leader of the Labour Party, after the loss of the general election. (May 11)
David Laws, Chief Secretary to the Treasury in the United Kingdom (May 30) Forced to resign over expenses abuse allegations, after it emerged he had channelled tens of thousands of pounds in public money to his longtime partner
Horst Köhler, President of Germany (May 31), due to controversial statements on overseas military deployment. 
Yukio Hatoyama, Prime Minister of Japan, resigned due to breaking a campaign promise to close an American military base on the island of Okinawa (June 8)
Kevin Rudd, resigned as Prime Minister of Australia and leader of the Australian Labor Party after the lost of leadership spill (June 24)
Fatmir Sejdiu resigned as President of Kosovo after the Constitutional Court held he had grossly violated the Constitution by simultaneously holding the presidency and chairmanship of a political party (September 27)

2011
Zine El Abidine Ben Ali, President of Tunisia (January 14), due to the Tunisian Revolution
Hosni Mubarak, President of Egypt (February 11), due to the Egyptian Revolution
Naoto Kan, Prime Minister of Japan (September 2), due to the Fukushima Daiichi nuclear disaster. 
Bruce Golding, Prime Minister of Jamaica (October 23)
Marcus Stephen, President of Nauru (November 10)
George Papandreou, Prime Minister of Greece, resigned due to economic crisis and to form a national unity government (November 10)
Silvio Berlusconi, Prime Minister of Italy, resigned after losing absolute majority in the Chamber of Deputies over his handling of the economic crisis (November 11)

2012
Uhuru Kenyatta, Finance Minister of Kenya, after being indicted by the International Criminal Court for crimes against humanity (January 26)
Emil Boc, Prime Minister of Romania (February 6), due to the 2012 Romanian protests
Wu Den-yih, Premier of the Republic of China, resigned to take the office as the vice president of the Republic of China (February 6)
Mohamed Nasheed, President of Maldives (February 7)
Christian Wulff, President of Germany (February 17)
Kevin Rudd, Foreign Minister of Australia (February 22)
Sir Anerood Jugnauth, President of Mauritius, to return to party politics (March 30)
Pál Schmitt, President of Hungary, in plagiarism scandal (April 2)
David Petraeus, Director of the Central Intelligence Agency, for an extramarital affair reportedly uncovered in an FBI investigation (November 9)
Michael Palmer, resigned as Singapore's Speaker of Parliament for an extramarital affair reportedly against a grassroots constituency director from People's Association (December 12)

2013
Annette Schavan, Education Minister of Germany, after her doctorate was revoked for plagiarism (February 9)
Benedict XVI, Pope and Sovereign of the Vatican City State (February 11), due to advanced age
Hamadi Jebali, Prime Minister of Tunisia, (March 14)
Mario Monti, resigned as Prime Minister of Italy (April 28)
Eric Shinseki, United States Secretary of Veterans Affairs, following a scandal over gross mismanagement by the department. (May 30)
Julia Gillard, resigned as Prime Minister of Australia and leader of the Australian Labor Party after the loss of a leadership spill (June 27)
Hanna Birna Kristjánsdóttir, Minister of the Interior of Iceland (December 4)

2014
Enrico Letta, resigned as Prime Minister of Italy (February 22)
Jean-Marc Ayrault, resigned as Prime Minister of France due to the lost of municipal elections (March 31)
Judith Collins, New Zealand Minister of Justice, conflict of interest, attempts to undermine public servants, association with right-wing hate blog. (August 30)
Alex Salmond, First Minister of Scotland, following the result of the 2014 independence referendum. (November 18)

2015
Giorgio Napolitano, President of Italy, resigned for illness and age reasons. (14 January)
John Kitzhaber, Governor of Oregon, following revelations involving Cylvia Hayes, Kitzhaber's fiancée. (February 18)
Ed Miliband, resigned as the Leader of the Labour Party, after their party's defeat following the general election. (May 8)
Nick Clegg, resigned as the Leader of the Liberal Democrats and Deputy Prime Minister of the United Kingdom, after their party's defeat following the general election. (May 8)
Otto Pérez Molina, President of Guatemala. (September 3)
Tony Abbott, resigned as the prime minister of Australia and leader of the Liberal Party of Australia after the defeat of leadership spill. (September 15)
John Boehner, resigned as the Speaker of the United States House of Representatives (October 29)

2016
David Ong, resigned as Singapore's Member of Parliament for an extramarital affair reportedly against a grassroots member from People's Action Party (March 12)
Sigmundur Davíð Gunnlaugsson, resigned as Prime Minister of Iceland due to scandal of Panama Papers (April 7).
David Cameron, resigned as Prime Minister of the United Kingdom and the leader of the Conservative Party after voters of the United Kingdom voted in favour on leaving the European Union in a Brexit referendum (July 13); Cameron retired from politics two months later (September 12).
Stephen Harper, former prime minister of Canada and leader of the Conservative Party of Canada, retired from politics (August 26)
Dilma Rousseff, President of Brazil, facing  impeachment (August 31)
Manuel Valls, Prime Minister of France resigned to stand in the next presidential election (December 6).
John Key, Prime Minister of New Zealand and New Zealand National Party leader (December 12).
Matteo Renzi, Prime Minister of Italy resigned after losing the 2016 Italian constitutional referendum (December 12).

2017
Nikki Haley, resigned as Governor of South Carolina to become the United States Ambassador to the United Nations (January 27)
Park Geun-hye, President of South Korea, facing  impeachment (March 10)
Robert J. Bentley, resigned as Governor of Alabama due to his involvement in a sex scandal with his political aide Rebekah Mason (April 10)
Terry Branstad, resigned as long-time Governor of Iowa to become the United States Ambassador to China (May 24)
Raúl Fernando Sendic Rodríguez, resigned as Vice-President of Uruguay at the conclusion of an investigation regarding his use of public funds while president of the State-owned company ANCAP (Uruguay) (September, 13)
Halimah Yacob, resigned as Singapore's Speaker of Parliament, in order to seek candidacy in the forthcoming Presidential Election (August 6)
Tom Price, resigned as United States Secretary of Health and Human Services (September 29)
Michael Fallon, resigned as the Secretary of State for Defence after allegations of harassment. (November 1)
Priti Patel, forced to resign as the Secretary of State for International Development after undisclosed meeting with Israeli officials on holiday in the country. (November 8)
Robert Mugabe, resigned as President of Zimbabwe during a military coup designed by Emerson Mnangagwa and being led by Constantino Chiwenga (November 21)

2018
Al Franken, resigned as United States Senator of Minnesota after accusations of sexual misconduct during a period of political sexual scandals (January 2)
Jacob Zuma, resigned as President of South Africa. (February 14)
Hailemariam Desalegn, resigned as Prime Minister of Ethiopia after wave of protests in Amhara and Oromia Region. (February 15)
Miro Cerar, resigned as Prime Minister of Slovenia following a Supreme Court decision to annul a referendum result that approved a railway construction project (the largest infrastructure project of the incumbent government). (March 14)
Robert Fico, resigned as Prime Minister of Slovakia in the wake of mass demonstrations against his governing coalition following the murder Ján Kuciak, a journalist who was investigating possible ties between government officials and an Italian organized crime syndicate at the time he and his fiancée were gunned down in their home. (March 15)
Pedro Pablo Kuczynski, resigned as President of Peru. (March 21)
Ameenah Gurib-Fakim, resigned as President of Mauritius following a scandal involving credit cards and shopping sprees. (March 23)
Paolo Gentiloni resigned as Prime Minister of Italy following the 2018 Italian general election. (March 24)
Tom Bossert, United States Homeland Security Advisor (April 10)
Amber Rudd, resigned as Secretary of State for the Home Department following misleading Parliament in the aftermath of the Windrush scandal. (April 29)
Eric Greitens, resigned as Governor of Missouri after accusations of sexual misconduct and misusing a charity donor list. (June 1)
Olivier Mahafaly Solonandrasana, resigned as Prime Minister of Madagascar. (June 4) 
Boris Johnson, resigned as Secretary of State for Foreign and Commonwealth Affairs following differences with Theresa May over Brexit Policy. (June 9)
David Davis (British politician), resigned as Secretary of State for Exiting the European Union following differences with Theresa May over Brexit Policy.
Malcolm Turnbull, resigned as Prime Minister of Australia following the Liberal Party of Australia leadership spills, 2018.
Sir Jeremy Heywood, resigned as UK Cabinet Secretary due of ill health following a three-month leave of absence. (October 24) 
Angela Merkel, announced plans to resign as Leader of the Christian Democratic Union of Germany and Chancellor of Germany by 2021. 
Tracey Crouch, resigned as Minister for Sport and Civil Society over the government's refusal to phase in changes to betting policy before Spring 2019, sparking cross-party rebellion in Parliament. (November 1)
Jo Johnson, resigned as Minister of State for Transport and Minister for London because of differences with the Theresa May over the government's Brexit policy. (November 9)
Dominic Raab, resigned as Secretary of State for Exiting the European Union in protest to the draft EU Withdrawal agreement approved by Cabinet the previous day. (November 15) 
Esther McVey, resigned as Secretary of State for Work and Pensions in protest to the draft EU Withdrawal agreement approved by Cabinet the previous day. (November 15)

2019 
Prime Minister of Papua New Guinea Peter O'Neill announces his resignation over disputes of him holding dual citizenship and after weeks of defections from his coalition government. (May 26)
Prime Minister of Denmark Lars Løkke Rasmussen resigns, but will remain as acting in the office until his succession after the defeating of his party in the 2019 Danish general election. (June 6)
Theresa May resigned as Prime Minister of the United Kingdom after her party (the Conservative Party) called for her to step down because of her inability to pass her Brexit Withdrawal Agreement. (July 24) 
Ricardo (Ricky) Antonio Rosselló Nevares resigned as Governor of Puerto Rico on July 24, 2019. He is the first Governor of Puerto Rico to resign. His resignation came after Puerto Rican people produced massive protests, during a twelve day span. On July 17, 2019, an estimated 500,000 people participated in a mass protest in Old San Juan calling for Rosselló to resign as Governor. These protests started after the known Telegramgate, also known as Chatgate or RickyLeaks that went public on July 8, 2019. Also, important members of his cabinet are currently accused on corruption charges for more than $15 million.
Ramush Haradinaj resigned as Prime Minister of Kosovo after being summoned by the Kosovo Specialist Chambers and Specialist Prosecutor's Office to be interviewed as a suspect (July 19); he has chosen to remain in office as a caretaker, although the opposition has challenged his legal basis to do so after his "irrevocable resignation"
 Jo Johnson MP resigned on 5 September as Minister of State for Universities, Science, Research and Innovation from the Johnson ministry in the United Kingdom, following Prime Minister Boris Johnson's decision to prorogue Parliament.
John Bolton, United States National Security Adviser (September 10)
 Amber Rudd MP resigned as Secretary of State for Work and Pensions of the Johnson ministry on 7 September, citing what she described as Johnson's "purge" of the party and his "failure" to pursue a Brexit deal with the EU.
 Evo Morales resigned as President of Bolivia on 10 November, citing that it will pacify the country after several days of civilian protests and an OAS audit that revealed irregularities in the 2019 Bolivian general election.
 Iraqi Prime Minister Adil Abdul-Mahdi resigns in reaction to the 2019–20 Iraqi protests. 
 Antti Rinne resigned as Prime Minister of Finland after losing support from his one of his party`s coalition parties, the Centre Party of Finland. He will remain as caretaker prime minister until a new government can be formed.

2020 

Sajid Javid resigned as Chancellor of the Exchequer during Boris Johnson's cabinet reshuffle. (February 13)
Mahathir Mohamad resigned as the prime minister of Malaysia the day after 
Jeremy Corbyn resigned as the Leader of the Labour Party after his party's defeat in the 2019 United Kingdom general election. (April 4) 
Süleyman Soylu resigned as the Minister of Interior of the Republic of Turkey during the COVID-19 pandemic. However, president Recep Tayyip Erdoğan would later refuse the resignation. (April 12)
Luiz Henrique Mandetta was fired as Ministry of Health of Brazil after numerous discussions, difference and dismissal from the current Brazilian president, Jair Bolsonaro, about the management of worrying rise of cases of coronavirus, being replaced with Nelson Teich, which would continue questioning the dubious handling of the president, having the same fate as him. (April 16)
Nelson Teich resigned as Ministry of Health of Brazil after many disagreements with President Bolsonaro. He defended a nationwide program and research of further treatment and potential vaccines against the COVID-19 pandemic, which Jair disagreed. He didn't gave a reason behind his decision but he publicly opposed erratic and dubious Jair's handling of the virus on several occasions. He couldn't establish himself in office for a month, resigning after four weeks of being elected. (May 15)
Ivan Collendavelloo resigned as Deputy Prime Minister and Minister of Energy of Mauritius, following the St Louis gate scandal. (June 25)
 Hassan Diab resigned as Prime Minister of Lebanon during the wake of the 2020 Beirut explosions after political pressure and fury of the Lebanese government and population for the failure of prevent this disaster from happening, causing heavy destruction of half of the country's capital, Beirut; this exacerbated by existing political turmoil within the country.
Hashim Thaçi resigns as President of Kosovo after being summoned by Kosovo Specialist Chambers.

2021 
January 6 resignations
Betsy DeVos, United States Secretary of Education (January 8)
Derrick Evans, West Virginia Delegate (January 9), resigned the day after being arrested for his role in the January 6 insurrection.
Elaine Chao, United States Secretary of Transportation (January 11)
Chad Wolf, acting United States Secretary of Homeland Security (January 11)
Alex Azar, United States Secretary of Health and Human Services (January 12), resignation effective on January 20.
Kamala Harris, United States Senator (January 18), resigned to take office as Vice President of the United States two days later.
Jüri Ratas resigned as Prime Minister of Estonia, after an investigation suspected that his party were involved in "criminal involvement" in relation to businessman Hillar Teder. (January 13th)
Mark Rutte and his entire cabinet resigned over the Dutch childcare benefits scandal. (January 15th)
Giuseppe Conte resigned as Prime Minister of Italy after a confidence vote in his government failed to pass with an absolute majority in the Italian Senate (January 26)
Nando Bodha resigned as Foreign Affairs Minister of Mauritius, as he disagreed with the way that ruling party MSM was handling emergent national matters. (January 06)
Yogida Sawmynaden resigned as Minister of Commerce of Mauritius, following a scandal involving fictitious employment as well as the murder of a political activist. (February 10)
Matt Hancock resigned as UK Health Secretary after breaching COVID-19 guidelines, which involved having an affair with his aide. (June 26th)
Andrew Cuomo resigned as governor of New York among growing scrutiny due to allegations of sexual harassment.
Prime Minister of Japan Yoshihide Suga resigned as Prime Minister of Japan on September 3, 2021 and would officially step down on September 30 after its party's leadership election.

2022 

Prime Minister of Kazakhstan Askar Mamin and his cabinet resigned on January 6, 2022 amidst protests against a sharp increase in fuel prices.
Christopher Pincher, Government Deputy Chief Whip, Treasurer of the Household, UK Government. On 30 June 2022, Pincher resigned as a Government Deputy Chief Whip, after he admitted being very drunk the night before at the private Carlton Club, a private members' club, in St James's, London and having "embarrassed myself and other people" It was alleged that he had groped two men.
Oliver Dowden, Chairman of the Conservative Party, UK Government. On 24 June 2022, Dowden resigned as Co-Chairman of the Conservative Party and Minister without Portfolio following the Conservative defeats at the Tiverton and Honiton by-election and Wakefield by-election, saying: "We cannot carry on with business as usual" and "Somebody must take responsibility".
Sajid Javid, Secretary of State for Health and Social Care UK Government. On 5 July 2022, Javid resigned as Secretary of State for Health and Social Care
 Rishi Sunak, Chancellor of the Exchequer UK Government. On 5 July 2022, Sunak resigned as chancellor moments after Sajid Javid resigned as health secretary. Upon his resignation, Sunak said that "the public rightly expect government to be conducted properly, competently and seriously"
 Bim Afolami, Vice Chair of the Conservative Party, UK Government. On 5 July 2022, whilst being interviewed live on television, Afolami resigned from his role as Vice Chair of the Conservative Party, owing to the recent scandals in government under Boris Johnson.
 Alex Chalk, Solicitor General for England and Wales, UK Government. On 5 July 2022, Chalk resigned as Solicitor General, citing the Owen Paterson scandal, Partygate and the Chris Pincher scandal.
 Will Quince, Parliamentary Under-Secretary of State for Children and Families UK Government, On 6 July 2022, in the wake of the resignations of Chancellor Rishi Sunak and Health Secretary Sajid Javid, Quince resigned from government after "accepting and repeating assurances to the media [from No 10] which have now been found to be inaccurate".
 Laura Trott, Parliamentary Private Secretary to the Department for Transport, UK Government. On 6 July 2022, in the wake of the resignations of Chancellor Rishi Sunak and Health Secretary Sajid Javid from the second Johnson ministry, Trott resigned as Parliamentary Private Secretary to the Department for Transport, citing "trust in politics is - and must always be - of the utmost importance, but sadly in recent months this has been lost".
 Robin Walker, Minister of State for School Standards, UK Government. On 6 July 2022, Schools minister Robin Walker has resigned from his post, saying he cannot “in good  conscience” serve in prime minister Boris Johnson’s government.
 John Glen, Economic Secretary to the Treasury, UK Government. On 6 July 2022, Glen resigned in a twitter post "...the poor judgement you [Boris Johnson] have shown, have made it impossible for me to square continued service with my conscience." and that "The country deserves better" 
 Felicity Buchan, Parliamentary Private Secretary in the Department for Business, Energy and Industrial Strategy, UK Government. On 6 July 2022, Buchan resigned from her PPS role, in protest against the leadership of Prime Minister Boris Johnson over his handling of the Chris Pincher scandal.
 Victoria Atkins, Minister of State for Prisons and Probation, UK Government. On 6 July 2022, Atkins resigned sharing her letter on instagram, citing issues around the Owen Paterson Scandal, Partygate, Chris Pincher scandal, and fractured values under the leadership of Boris Johnson.
 Stuart Andrew, Minister of State for Housing, UK Government. On 6 July 2022, Andrew resigned from the role of Minister of State for Housing due to the recent scandals involving the current Conservative Party (UK) leader and Prime Minister Boris Johnson, citing that "There comes a time when you have to look at your own personal integrity and that time is now. Therefore, given recent events I have no other choice to resign. Our party, particularly our members and more importantly our great country, deserve better."
 5 Minsters From the UK Government, On 6 July 2022, 5 members of the UK cabinet resigned together in a joint letter submitted to Boris Johnson. Julia Lopez was a culture minister, Lee Rowley was a business minister, Alex Burghart was an education minister, Neil O'Brien was a levelling up minister. Kemi Badenoch was a local government minister.
 Mims Davies, Parliamentary Under-Secretary of State for Employment, UK Government. On 6 July 2022, Davies resigned from her position as Parliamentary Under-Secretary at the Department for Work and Pensions, losing confidence in Boris Johnson as a result of the Chris Pincher scandal.
 On 7 July 2022, Boris Johnson, Prime Minister of the United Kingdom resigned from his position.
 Chris Philip, Minister of Technology resigned from his position.
On 21 July 2022, Mario Draghi resigned as Prime Minister of Italy after a confidence vote in his government failed to pass with an absolute majority in the Italian Senate.
 On 20 October 2022, Liz Truss, Prime Minister of the United Kingdom resigned from her position.
 On 8 November 2022, Gavin Williamson, Minister without portfolio (United Kingdom), resigned after he was accused of bullying.

2023
On 19 January 2023, Jacinda Ardern, Prime Minister of New Zealand, resigned citing burnout while facing an upcoming election and low polling numbers.

See also
List of resignations in Iceland
List of resignations from the second May ministry
List of departures from the first Johnson ministry
List of departures from the second Johnson ministry
List of Trump administration dismissals and resignations

References

Termination of employment
Government-related lists
Lists of political scandals
Government